Afyon Airport is an airport located at Afyon, Afyon Province, Turkey. The airport is closed to civil air traffic, but operates as a military air base.

References

Airports in Turkey
Buildings and structures in Afyonkarahisar Province